The 2009–10 Swiss Super League is the 113th season of top-tier football in Switzerland. The competition is officially named AXPO Super League due to sponsoring purposes. It began on 11 July 2009 and has ended in May 2010. FC Zürich were the defending champions. The title was won by FC Basel.

Promotion and relegation
Liechtenstein side FC Vaduz were relegated after finishing in 10th and last place in 2008–09 Swiss Super League. They were replaced by Challenge League 2008–09 champions FC St. Gallen.

9th-placed FC Luzern and Challenge League runners-up FC Lugano competed in a two-legged relegation play-off after the end of the 2008–09 season. Lucerne won 5–1 aggregate and thus remained in Super League .

Stadia and locations

League table

Results
Teams play each other four times in this league. In the first half of the season each team played every other team twice (home and away) and then do the same in the second half of the season.

First half of season

Second half of season

Relegation play-offs
AC Bellinzona as 9th-placed team of the Super League played a two-legged play-off against Challenge League runners-up AC Lugano.

Bellinzona won 2–1 on aggregate.

Top goalscorers
Updated on 16 May 2010; Source: Swiss Football League

References

External links
 Super League website 
 soccerway.com

Swiss Super League seasons
Swiss
1